Kim Probst (born 6 March 1981) is an American synchronized swimmer who competed in the 2008 Summer Olympics.

References

1981 births
Living people
American synchronized swimmers
Olympic synchronized swimmers of the United States
Synchronized swimmers at the 2008 Summer Olympics